The 2013 Kvalserien was the 39th Kvalserien, consisting of two Elitserien (SHL) teams and four HockeyAllsvenskan teams. It began on 14 March 2013 and ended on 5 April 2013. The 2013 Kvalserien determined which two teams of the participating ones would play in the 2013–14 SHL season and which four teams would play in the 2013–14 HockeyAllsvenskan season.

For the first time since 2006, neither of the two Elitserien teams – Timrå IK and Rögle BK – managed to defend their spot in the top-tier league. Instead, HockeyAllsvenskan teams Örebro HK and Leksands IF took the two available spots for the 2013–14 SHL season. Örebro went undefeated in regulation time throughout the ten games and secured promotion in the seventh round (of ten), while Leksand secured their SHL spot in the following round. Örebro promoted to the SHL for the first time in club history (another Örebro team, Örebro IK, last played in the Elitserien in 1978–79), while Leksand returned to the SHL for the first time since the 2005–06 season. Timrå were relegated to HockeyAllsvenskan for the first time since 2000, while Rögle's return to Elitserien lasted for only one season.

Participating teams

From Elitserien (ranked 11–12)
Timrå IK
Rögle BK

From HockeyAllsvenskan (ranked 1–3) 
Leksands IF
Södertälje SK
VIK Västerås HK

From HockeyAllsvenskan playoff round
Örebro HK

Standings

Game log 

|-
| rowspan="3" | 1 || rowspan="3" | March 14 || Timrå IK || 3–2 SO || Örebro HK || E.ON Arena || 4,377
|-
| Rögle BK || 2–3 || VIK Västerås HK || Lindab Arena || 3,752
|-
| Leksands IF || 3–1 || Södertälje SK || Tegera Arena || 6,772
|-
| rowspan="3" | 2 || rowspan="3" | March 16 || Södertälje SK || 1–4 || Rögle BK || AXA Sports Center || 4,582
|-
| VIK Västerås HK || 2–1 SO || Timrå IK || ABB Arena Nord || 4,902
|-
| Örebro HK || 5–2 || Leksands IF || Behrn Arena || 5,065
|-
| rowspan="3" | 3 || rowspan="3" | March 19 || Timrå IK || 4–1 || Södertälje SK || E.ON Arena || 4,266
|-
| Rögle BK || 0–4 || Leksands IF || Lindab Arena || 4,651
|-
| VIK Västerås HK || 0–1 || Örebro HK || ABB Arena Nord || 4,590
|-
| rowspan="3" | 4 || rowspan="3" | March 21 || Leksands IF || 6–2 || Timrå IK || Tegera Arena || 7,650
|-
| Södertälje SK || 3–2 || VIK Västerås HK || AXA Sports Center || 3,538
|-
| Örebro HK || 2–0 || Rögle BK || Behrn Arena || 4,172
|-
| rowspan="3" | 5 || rowspan="3" | March 23 || Södertälje SK || 2–3 || Örebro HK || AXA Sports Center || 4,255
|-
| VIK Västerås HK || 1–3 || Leksands IF || ABB Arena Nord || 4,902
|-
| Timrå IK || 3–5 || Rögle BK || E.ON Arena || 4,375
|-
| rowspan="3" | 6 || rowspan="3" | March 26 || Rögle BK || 0–1 || Timrå IK || Lindab Arena || 3,744
|-
| Leksands IF || 4–1 || VIK Västerås HK || Tegera Arena || 7,650
|-
| Örebro HK || 3–0 || Södertälje SK || Behrn Arena || 5,208
|-
| rowspan="3" | 7 || rowspan="3" | March 28 || Timrå IK || 3–8 || Leksands IF || E.ON Arena || 5,625
|-
| Rögle BK || 2–5 || Örebro HK || Lindab Arena || 2,356
|-
| VIK Västerås HK || 1–0 || Södertälje SK || ABB Arena Nord || 2,631
|-
| rowspan="3" | 8 || rowspan="3" | March 30 || Leksands IF || 3–1 || Rögle BK || Tegera Arena || 7,650
|-
| Södertälje SK || 3–8 || Timrå IK || AXA Sports Center || 2,698
|-
| Örebro HK || 5–4 SO || VIK Västerås HK || Behrn Arena || 4,906
|-

|-
| rowspan="3" | 9 || rowspan="3" | April 2 || Timrå IK || 3–2 || VIK Västerås HK || E.ON Arena || 2,736
|-
| Rögle BK || 3–2 OT || Södertälje SK || Lindab Arena || 2,188
|-
| Leksands IF || 1–2 OT || Örebro HK || Tegera Arena || 7,258
|-
| rowspan="3" | 10 || rowspan="3" | April 5 || Södertälje SK ||  3–2  || Leksands IF || AXA Sports Center || 5,058
|-
| VIK Västerås HK || 3–1 || Rögle BK || ABB Arena Nord || 2,564
|-
| Örebro HK || 1–2 SO || Timrå IK || Behrn Arena || 4,808
|-

Statistics

Scoring leaders 
 
Updated as of the end of the season.
GP = Games played; G = Goals; A = Assists; Pts = Points; +/– = Plus/minus; PIM = Penalty minutes

Leading goaltenders 
These are the leaders in GAA among goaltenders who have played at least 40% of the team's minutes. Updated as of the end of the season.

GP = Games played; TOI = Time on ice (minutes); GA = Goals against; SO = Shutouts; Sv% = Save percentage; GAA = Goals against average

References

External links 
Official statistics for ice hockey in Sweden

Kvalserien
2013